Ondo may refer to:

Japan
 Ondo, Hiroshima
 Ondo (music), a style of folk music
 Ondo class oiler, ships of the Imperial Japanese Navy

Nigeria
 Ondo City
 Ondo State
 Roman Catholic Diocese of Ondo
 Ondo Kingdom (c. 1510–1899)

People
 Daniel Ona Ondo (born 1945), Gabonese politician 
 Emilia Mikue Ondo (born 1984), Equatoguinean runner
Estelle Ondo (born 1970), Gabonese politician
 Jean François Ondo (1916 – after 1963), Gabonese foreign minister
 Gilles Mbang Ondo (born 1985), Gabonese football player
 Jocksy Ondo-Louemba (born 1985), Gabonese journalist and writer.